The Edwin O. Reischauer Lectures is a series  of lectures at Harvard University sponsored by the John King Fairbank Center established in 1986 to be given annually  in memory of Edwin O. Reischauer. The lectures are then published by Harvard University Press.

List of lectures
 2015 Kären Wigen, "Where in the World? Mapmaking at the Asia-Pacific Margin, 1600-1900"
 2014 Nancy S. Steinhardt, '"East Asian Internationalism and Beyond: The Sixth Century"
  2013 Shigehisa Kuriyama, "What Truly Matters?" 
 2012 Donald S. Lopez, Jr., "The White Lama Ippolito" Video
 2011 Benjamin A. Elman, Undoing/Redoing Modern Sino-Japanese Cultural and Intellectual History (2011) links to videos of lectures.
 2010 Timothy Brook. "For What It’s Worth: Prices and Values in Ming China"
 2009 Dwight H. Perkins, East Asian Development: Foundations and Strategies (2013 ) 
 2008  Susan Greenhalgh, Cultivating Global Citizens: Population in the Rise of China ( 2010 ) 
 2007  Joshua A. Fogel,  Articulating the Sinosphere: Sino-Japanese Relations in Space and Time (2009 ) }
 2006 Leonard Blussé, Visible Cities: Canton, Nagasaki, and Batavia and the Coming of the Americans (2008 ) 
 2001  Alexander Woodside, Lost Modernities: China, Vietnam, Korea, and the Hazards of World History (2006 ) 
 2000 Warren I. Cohen,  The Asian American Century (2002 ) 
 1999 G. William Skinner, "Family and Reproduction in East Asia: A Tale of Three Cultures"
 1997 Gungwu Wang, The Chinese Overseas: From Earthbound China to the Quest for Autonomy (2002 ) 
 1993 James Cahill, The Lyric Journey: Poetic Painting in China and Japan (1996 ) 
 1990 Ezra F. Vogel,  The Four Little Dragons: The Spread of Industrialization in East Asia (1993 ) 
  1989 Akira Iriye,  China and Japan in the Global Setting (1998 ) 
 1988 Robert A. Scalapino,   Politics of Development: Perspectives on Twentieth-Century Asia (1998 ) 
  1988 Marius B. Jansen, China in the Tokugawa World (1992 ) ; DeGruyter 2014)
 1986 Wm. Theodore de Bary,  East Asian Civilizations: A Dialogue in Five Stages (1991 )

References 
 The Edwin O. Reischauer Lectures

Notes

Lecture series
Harvard University Press books